St. John the Baptist is a religious figure in Christianity, Islam, and Mandaeanism.

St. John the Baptist may also refer to:

Art
 John the Baptist (Caravaggio), at least eight paintings by Caravaggio
 St. John the Baptist (Ghiberti), a bronze statue by Lorenzo Ghiberti
 Saint John the Baptist (Leonardo), a painting by Leonardo da Vinci

Churches
 St. John the Baptist Ukrainian Catholic National Shrine, a Ukrainian Catholic church in Ottawa, Canada
 St. John the Baptist Church, Coventry in West Midlands, England
 St John the Baptist's Church, Hove, England
 St. John the Baptist Roman Catholic Church (Wilder, Kentucky), US
 St. John the Baptist Church (Pottsville, Pennsylvania), a Roman Catholic church, US
 The Episcopal Church of St. John the Baptist, a church in Milton, Sussex County, in the Episcopal Diocese of Delaware, US

See also
 Saint-Jean-Baptiste (disambiguation)
 San Juan Bautista (disambiguation)
 Saint John (disambiguation)